is a 1990 Japanese film directed by Buichi Saitō. The lead star is Hisaya Morishige. It is based on Teru Miyamoto`s novel of the same title.

Plot

Cast
Hisaya Morishige as Kumago Matsuzaka
Yumiko Nogawa as Fusae Matsuzaka
Kōichi Satō as Tadashi Tsujidou
Teruhiko Saigō as Taichi Ebihara
Yuko Asano as Ayako Iwai
Jun Inoue as Tony Okada
Rino Katase as Someno
 Gannosuke Ashiya as Chiyoma Maruo
 Takuya Fujioka as Chigusa
 Yumi Takigawa as Chiyotsuru
Shinsuke Ashida as Kawachi
Shigeru Tsuyuguchi as Takeshi Tsutsui
Tomoko Naraoka as Iwai
Tomokazu Miura as Mokichi Kitazawa

References

External links

1990 films
1990s Japanese-language films
Films about geisha
1980s Japanese films